The Baitus Salam (House of Peace) is a mosque in Sarajevo run by the Ahmadiyya Muslim Community (AMJ) in Bosnia and Herzegovina.

See also 
 Islam in Bosnia and Herzegovina
 List of mosques in Europe

Ahmadiyya mosques in Bosnia and Herzegovina
Mosques in Sarajevo
Mosques completed in 2004
21st-century mosques